The 2016–17 Liga de Nuevos Talentos season was split in two tournaments Apertura and Clausura. Liga de Nuevos Talentos was the fourth–tier football league of Mexico. The season was played between 12 August 2016 and 14 May 2017.

Torneo Apertura

Changes from the previous season 
21 teams participated in this tournament.

Atlético San Luis "B", Tecomán F.C., Selva Cañera and Académicos de Atlas disappeared from the League.
Tigrillos de Chetumal eliminated his main team.
Yalmakán F.C., Cuatetes de Acapulco F.C., Atlético Lagunero and Dorados "B" new expansion teams for the league.
C.D. Uruapan could not dispute this competition and lent his franchise to Titanes de Saltillo.
Sporting Canamy was promoted to the Liga Premier de Ascenso as an expansion team.
Zorros de la UMSNH changed its name to Alacranes Rojos de Apatzingán.
Jiquipilas Valle Verde F.C. was promoted after being runner-up in the Tercera División.

Stadiums and locations

Group 1

Group 2

Group 3

Regular season

Group 1

Standings

Results

Group 2

Standings

Results

Group 3

Standings

Results

Regular-season statistics

Top goalscorers 
Players sorted first by goals scored, then by last name.

Source: Liga Premier

Liguilla

Liguilla 
The four best teams of each group play two games against each other on a home-and-away basis. The higher seeded teams play on their home field during the second leg. The winner of each match up is determined by aggregate score. In the quarterfinals and semifinals, if the two teams are tied on aggregate the higher seeded team advances. In the final, if the two teams are tied after both legs, the match goes to extra time and, if necessary, a penalty shoot-out.

Quarter-finals
The first legs was played on 16 and 17 November, and the second legs was played on 19 and 20 November 2016.

First leg

Second leg

Semi-finals
The first legs was played on 24 November, and the second legs was played on 27 November 2016.

First leg

Second leg

Final
The first leg was played on 1 December, and the second leg was played on 4 December 2016.

First leg

Second leg

Torneo Clausura

Regular season

Group 1

Standings

Results

Group 2

Standings

Results

Group 3

Standings

Results

Regular-season statistics

Top goalscorers 
Players sorted first by goals scored, then by last name.

Source: Liga Premier

Liguilla

Liguilla 
The four best teams of each group play two games against each other on a home-and-away basis. The higher seeded teams play on their home field during the second leg. The winner of each match up is determined by aggregate score. In the quarterfinals and semifinals, if the two teams are tied on aggregate the higher seeded team advances. In the final, if the two teams are tied after both legs, the match goes to extra time and, if necessary, a penalty shoot-out.

(*) Calor was classified by its position in the season table

Quarter-finals
The first legs was played on 15 and 16 April, and the second legs was played on 22 and 23 April 2017.

First leg

Second leg

Semi-finals
The first legs was played on 27 April, and the second legs was played on 30 April 2017.

First leg

Second leg

Final
The first leg was played on 4 May, and the second leg was played on 7 May 2017.

First leg

Second leg

Relegation Table 

Last updated: 9 April 2017 Source:Segunda DivisiónP = Position; G = Games played; Pts = Points; Pts/G = Ratio of points to games played

Promotion Final
The Promotion Final is a series of matches played by the champions of the tournaments Apertura and Clausura, the game is played to determine the winning team of the promotion to Liga Premier de Ascenso. 
The first leg was played on 11 May 2017, and the second leg was played on 14 May 2017.

First leg

Second leg

See also 
2016–17 Liga MX season
2016–17 Ascenso MX season
2016–17 Liga Premier de Ascenso season

References

External links 
 Official website of Liga Premier
 Magazine page 

 
1